Ross Reid may refer to:

 Ross Reid (cyclist) (born 1987), Welsh former professional racing cyclist
 Ross Reid (politician) (born 1952), Canadian former politician
 Ross T. Reid (1832–1915), pastoralist in South Australia and New South Wales